Quecreek is an unincorporated community and coal town in Somerset County, Pennsylvania, United States. It was also known as Harrison. Quemahoning Creek Coal Company operated two mines in Quecreek in 1918. The post office closed in 2005. The 2002 Quecreek Mine rescue occurred nearby.

References

Unincorporated communities in Somerset County, Pennsylvania
Coal towns in Pennsylvania
Unincorporated communities in Pennsylvania